Brendan James Jenkins (born 1 October 1959 in Bendigo, Victoria) is the former Labor Party member for Morwell in the Victorian Legislative Assembly. Jenkins lost his seat to Nationals candidate Russell Northe after a swing to the Nationals in the 2006 election.

References

1959 births
Living people
Australian Labor Party members of the Parliament of Victoria
People from Bendigo
Members of the Victorian Legislative Assembly
21st-century Australian politicians